Ukraine competed at the 2022 World Athletics Championships in Eugene, Oregon from 15 to 24 July 2022. Ukraine had entered 22 athletes.

Medalists

Results

Men
Field events

Women
Track and road events

Field events

References

Ukraine
World Championships in Athletics
2022